The Spanish Quidditch Cup is the main quidditch championship of Spain. It's an annual event, celebrated for the first time in 2016. The 2016 Spanish Quidditch Cup was the first edition of this tournament. It was played on the February 6th and 7th, 2016 in Campo Grande football fields in Rivas-Vaciamadrid, Madrid. 8 teams from Andalusia, Basque Country, Galicia and Madrid joined for this event where the locals, Madrid Wolves, won the championship beating Bizkaia Boggarts in the final 140-70*.

History

Winners

By teams

By regions

See also

 Quidditch in Spain
 International Quidditch Association

References

External links

Quidditch competitions
Sports competitions in Spain
Recurring sporting events established in 2016
2016 establishments in Spain